Jack Hartwell Sr. was an Australian rugby league footballer who played in the 1930s for Western Suburbs and Canterbury-Bankstown.  Hartwell was the father of Jack Hartwell Jnr who played for Canterbury between 1948 and 1951.

Playing career
Hartwell made his first grade debut for Western Suburbs in 1934 playing in 2 games for the club as they finished as minor premiers and eventually won the premiership defeating Eastern Suburbs in the grand final.

In 1935, Hartwell joined newly admitted Canterbury-Bankstown and played in the club first ever game against North Sydney at North Sydney Oval on 25 April 1935.  The match ended in a 20–5 defeat with Hartwell scoring the club's first try.

In 1936, Hartwell played 11 games as Canterbury went from finishing second last in 1935 to finishing 2nd and qualifying for their first finals campaign.  Hartwell played in the 25–13 loss against Eastern Suburbs.  This would be Hartwell's final season in first grade.

References

Australian rugby league players
Western Suburbs Magpies players
Canterbury-Bankstown Bulldogs players
Rugby league players from Sydney
Rugby league props
Year of birth missing
Year of death missing
Place of birth missing
Place of death missing